The 2019 UEFA European Under-17 Championship qualifying competition was a men's under-17 football competition that determined the 15 teams joining the automatically qualified hosts Republic of Ireland in the 2019 UEFA European Under-17 Championship final tournament.

Apart from Republic of Ireland, all remaining 54 UEFA member national teams entered the qualifying competition. Players born on or after 1 January 2002 were eligible to participate. Starting from this season, up to five substitutions are permitted per team in each match. Moreover, each match has a regular duration of 90 minutes, instead of 80 minutes in previous seasons.

Format
The qualifying competition consists of two rounds:
Qualifying round: Apart from England and Germany, which receive byes to the elite round as the teams with the highest seeding coefficient, the remaining 52 teams are drawn into 13 groups of four teams. Each group is played in single round-robin format at one of the teams selected as hosts after the draw. The 13 group winners, the 13 runners-up, and the four third-placed teams with the best record against the first and second-placed teams in their group advance to the elite round.
Elite round: The 32 teams are drawn into eight groups of four teams. Each group is played in single round-robin format at one of the teams selected as hosts after the draw. The eight group winners and the seven runners-up with the best record against the first and third-placed teams in their group qualify for the final tournament.

The schedule of each group is as follows, with two rest days between each matchday (Regulations Article 20.04):

Tiebreakers
In the qualifying round and elite round, teams are ranked according to points (3 points for a win, 1 point for a draw, 0 points for a loss), and if tied on points, the following tiebreaking criteria are applied, in the order given, to determine the rankings (Regulations Articles 14.01 and 14.02):
Points in head-to-head matches among tied teams;
Goal difference in head-to-head matches among tied teams;
Goals scored in head-to-head matches among tied teams;
If more than two teams are tied, and after applying all head-to-head criteria above, a subset of teams are still tied, all head-to-head criteria above are reapplied exclusively to this subset of teams;
Goal difference in all group matches;
Goals scored in all group matches;
Penalty shoot-out if only two teams have the same number of points, and they met in the last round of the group and are tied after applying all criteria above (not used if more than two teams have the same number of points, or if their rankings are not relevant for qualification for the next stage);
Disciplinary points (red card = 3 points, yellow card = 1 point, expulsion for two yellow cards in one match = 3 points);
UEFA coefficient for the qualifying round draw;
Drawing of lots.

To determine the four best third-placed teams from the qualifying round and the seven best runners-up from the elite round, the results against the teams in fourth place are discarded. The following criteria are applied (Regulations Articles 15.01, 15.02 and 15.03):
Points;
Goal difference;
Goals scored;
Disciplinary points;
UEFA coefficient for the qualifying round draw;
Drawing of lots.

Qualifying round

Draw
The draw for the qualifying round was held on 6 December 2017, 09:00 CET (UTC+1), at the UEFA headquarters in Nyon, Switzerland.

The teams were seeded according to their coefficient ranking, calculated based on the following (a four-year window was used instead of the previous three-year window):
2014 UEFA European Under-17 Championship final tournament and qualifying competition (qualifying round and elite round)
2015 UEFA European Under-17 Championship final tournament and qualifying competition (qualifying round and elite round)
2016 UEFA European Under-17 Championship final tournament and qualifying competition (qualifying round and elite round)
2017 UEFA European Under-17 Championship final tournament and qualifying competition (qualifying round and elite round)

Each group contained one team from Pot A, one team from Pot B, one team from Pot C, and one team from Pot D. For political reasons, Russia and Ukraine, Spain and Gibraltar, Serbia and Kosovo, and Bosnia and Herzegovina and Kosovo would not be drawn in the same group.

Notes
Teams marked in bold have qualified for the final tournament.

Groups
The qualifying round must be played by 20 November 2018.

Times up to 27 October 2018 are CEST (UTC+2), thereafter times are CET (UTC+1), as listed by UEFA (local times, if different, are in parentheses).

Group 1

Group 2

Group 3

Group 4

Group 5

Group 6

Group 7

Group 8

Group 9

Group 10

The Northern Ireland v Slovakia match, kick-off on 24 October, 13:00 TRT, was abandoned after 13 minutes due to adverse weather conditions, with the remainder of the game played on 25 October, 13:00 TRT. The Turkey v San Marino match, scheduled for kick-off on 24 October, 16:30 TRT, was also postponed due to adverse weather conditions, and rescheduled to 25 October, 15:00 TRT.

Group 11

Group 12

Group 13

Ranking of third-placed teams
To determine the four best third-placed teams from the qualifying round which advance to the elite round, only the results of the third-placed teams against the first and second-placed teams in their group are taken into account.

Elite round

Draw
The draw for the elite round was held on 6 December 2018, 11:45 CET (UTC+1), at the UEFA headquarters in Nyon, Switzerland.

The teams were seeded according to their results in the qualifying round. England and Germany, which received byes to the elite round, were automatically seeded into Pot A. Each group contained one team from Pot A, one team from Pot B, one team from Pot C, and one team from Pot D. Winners and runners-up from the same qualifying round group could not be drawn in the same group, but the best third-placed teams could be drawn in the same group as winners or runners-up from the same qualifying round group. For political reasons, Kosovo would not be drawn in the same group as either Serbia or Bosnia and Herzegovina.

Groups
The elite round is scheduled to be played by the end of March 2019.

Times up to 30 March 2019 are CET (UTC+1), thereafter times are CEST (UTC+2), as listed by UEFA (local times, if different, are in parentheses).

Group 1

Group 2

Group 3

Group 4

Group 5
Note: Spain were originally to host the group between 20–26 March 2019, but were removed by UEFA as Spain do not recognize Kosovo's independence and would not allow the display of Kosovan symbols. As Ukraine and Greece, the other two teams in the group, also do not recognize Kosovo's independence, UEFA decided the group would be played in the neutral host country Switzerland between 25–31 March 2019.

Group 6

Group 7

Group 8

Ranking of second-placed teams
To determine the seven best second-placed teams from the elite round which qualify for the final tournament, only the results of the second-placed teams against the first and third-placed teams in their group are taken into account.

Qualified teams
The following 16 teams qualify for the final tournament.

1 Bold indicates champions for that year. Italic indicates hosts for that year.

Goalscorers
In the qualifying round, 
In the elite round, 
In total,

References

External links

Qualification
2019
2018 in youth association football
2019 in youth association football
September 2018 sports events in Europe
October 2018 sports events in Europe
November 2018 sports events in Europe
March 2019 sports events in Europe
April 2019 sports events in Europe